N'Torosso or N'Torosso Bolokalasso is a small town and commune in the Cercle of San in the Ségou Region of Mali. As of 1998 the commune had a population of 9,863.

References

Communes of Ségou Region